Villanova di Camposampiero is a comune (municipality) in the Province of Padua in the Italian region Veneto, located about  west of Venice and about  northeast of Padua.

Villanova di Camposampiero borders the following municipalities: Borgoricco, Campodarsego, Pianiga, Santa Maria di Sala, Vigonza.

Demographic evolution

References

Cities and towns in Veneto